Alice Nutter may refer to:

 Alice Nutter (alleged witch) (died 1612), English woman hanged during the Pendle witch trials
 Alice Nutter (writer) (born 1962), former singer for the English anarchist music group Chumbawamba